Paramantis prasina is the type species of praying mantis in the genus Paramantis.

Distribution
It is found in Africa south of the Sahara.

References

Mantidae
Insects described in 1839
Mantodea of Africa